Daniel Pedro Minorelli (born 31 July 1984 in São Paulo) is a Brazilian footballer.

References

External links 
 (Brasil) http://torinobrasil.com.br/
 Official site

1984 births
Living people
Brazilian footballers
Expatriate footballers in Germany
Santos FC players
A.C. Cuneo 1905 players
Brazilian expatriates in Italy
A.S.D. Martina Calcio 1947 players
Brazilian expatriate sportspeople in Germany
Brazilian expatriate sportspeople in Italy
Torino F.C. players
Expatriate footballers in Italy
A.S.D. Calcio Ivrea players
SpVgg Unterhaching players
3. Liga players
Association football midfielders